Voluntari is a town in Ilfov County, Muntenia, Romania. It is located at a distance of 1 km from the northern border of Bucharest (on the DN2 road towards Urziceni) and is thus frequently viewed as a suburb of Bucharest.

The population is 42,944 inhabitants according to the 2011 census, with an ethnic composition, among those for whom data are available, of 94.8% Romanians, 1.3% Romani, 0.9% Chinese, 0.5% Turks and 2.5% of other ethnic groups.

The low price of land, the proximity to Bucharest, and the easy and reliable access to both the railway network and the road network have allowed a steady development of industrial and commercial facilities, especially in the light industry and import/export commerce. The town's output estimate increased by over 25% between 2001 and 2005. Even with such high development rates, many residents commute to Bucharest. Voluntari is the site of a shopping centre known as Jolie Ville Galleria, as well as the headquarters of the Vodafone Romania company.

Voluntari literally means "Volunteers", in Romanian, having been founded by the volunteer soldiers who fought for Romania in World War I and were given plots to build their homes there after the war. The settlement received city status in 2004.

Local government

The Voluntari Local Council (Consiliul Local Voluntari) has 19 councillors. It currently has the following party composition:

Transport
Voluntari has its own bus network, operated by the local council, consisting of five bus routes: 1, 2, 153, 155 and 167. Additionally, the city is connected to Bucharest by bus routes run by STB, Bucharest's public transport operator.

Sport
FC Voluntari – football club

Education 
Voluntari is the site of the American International School of Bucharest, the British School of Bucharest, the Mark Twain International School, and the Japanese School in Bucharest.

Natives
 Anișoara Matei (born 1951), sports shooter 
 Iuliana Munteanu (born 1955), rower

See also
 Pipera

References

Towns in Romania
Populated places in Ilfov County
Localities in Muntenia